Lincoln Parish School Board is a school district headquartered in Ruston, Louisiana, United States. The district serves Lincoln Parish.

State Representative Rob Shadoin, a Republican lawyer from Ruston, is a former member of the board.

Schools

K-12 schools

7-12 schools

9-12 schools
 Ruston High School (Ruston)

K-8 schools
 A. E. Phillips Laboratory School (Ruston)

7-8 schools
 Ruston Junior High School (Ruston)

PK, 4-6 schools
 Lincoln Center School (Ruston)

6 Schools
 I. A. Lewis Elementary School (Ruston)

Elementary schools
K-6
 Choudrant Elementary School (Choudrant)
 Hico Elementary School (Unincorporated area)
K-5
 Cypress Springs Elementary School (Ruston)
 Glen View Elementary School (Ruston)
 Hillcrest Elementary School (Ruston)
 Ruston Elementary School (Ruston)

External links
 Lincoln Parish School Board

Education in Lincoln Parish, Louisiana
School districts in Louisiana